Irena Ossola (born April 19, 1988) is an American professional racing cyclist. who last rode for the UCI Women's Team  during the 2019 women's road cycling season.

References

External links
 

1988 births
Living people
American female cyclists
Place of birth missing (living people)
21st-century American women